Embu Airport is an airport in Kenya.

Location
Embu Airport, is located in Embu County, in the town of Embu.

The geographic coordinates of this airport are 00°34'08.0"S, 37°29'32.0"E (Latitude:-0.568890; Longitude:37.492221).

Overview
Embu Airport is a small civilian airport, serving the town of Embu and surrounding communities.

Scheduled upgrade
In August 2016, Martin Wambora, the Governor of Embu County, announced that the county would, in partnership with the national government and foreign private investors, spend KES:10 billion (approx. US$100 million), to refurbish the airport to international standards, including the following upgrades:

 Lengthen the runway to 
 Build new terminal buildings
 Build warehouses
 Build a hangar
 Construct an airport apron.

See also
 Kenya Airports Authority
 Kenya Civil Aviation Authority
 List of airports in Kenya

References

External links
  Website of Kenya Airports Authority
 List of Airports In Kenya
 Airkenya Routes

Airports in Kenya
Eastern Province (Kenya)
Embu County